This is an alphabetical list of Japanese noise, or "Japanoise" (ジャパノイズ) bands and solo projects that have articles on Wikipedia.

See also
Improvised Music from Japan
Japanoise
List of experimental musicians
List of musicians by genre
List of noise musicians
Noise music

Notes

Lists of Japanese musicians
Lists of musicians by genre
Noise music